Uttlesford District Council is elected every four years.

Political control

Leadership
The leaders of the council since 1995 have been:

Council elections
1973 Uttlesford District Council election
1976 Uttlesford District Council election (New ward boundaries)
1979 Uttlesford District Council election
1983 Uttlesford District Council election
1987 Uttlesford District Council election (District boundary changes took place but the number of seats remained the same)
1991 Uttlesford District Council election (District boundary changes took place but the number of seats remained the same)
1995 Uttlesford District Council election (District boundary changes took place but the number of seats remained the same)
1999 Uttlesford District Council election
2003 Uttlesford District Council election (New ward boundaries)
2007 Uttlesford District Council election
2011 Uttlesford District Council election (Some new ward boundaries)
2015 Uttlesford District Council election (New ward boundaries)
2019 Uttlesford District Council election

By-election results

1995-1999

1999-2003

2003-2007

2007-2011

References

External links
Uttlesford District Council

 
Council elections in Essex
District council elections in England